Half Note is a live album by saxophonist Clifford Jordan which was recorded in 1974 and first released on the SteepleChase label in 1985.

Reception

In his review on Allmusic, Scott Yanow notes that this is "An good example of Jordan's music"

Track listing 
All compositions by Clifford Jordan except as indicated
 "Holy Land" (Cedar Walton) - 8:41   
 "The Glass Bead Games" - 5:38   
 "St. Thomas" (Sonny Rollins) - 9:58   
 "Rhythm-a-Ning" (Thelonious Monk) - 8:57   
 "Midnight Waltz" (Walton) - 9:17   
 "The Highest Mountain" - 6:45

Personnel 
Clifford Jordan - tenor saxophone
Cedar Walton - piano
Sam Jones - bass
Albert Heath  - drums

References 

Clifford Jordan live albums
1985 live albums
SteepleChase Records live albums